9-Deacetoxyfumigaclavine C is an ergoline alkaloid.  It is a potent, selective, anticancer compound, with in vitro activity comparable to doxorubicin (IC50 = 3.1 μM against K562). 9-Deacetoxyfumigaclavine C is a compound made by a variety of fungi.

References

Ergolines